Mark Hawthorne (born 16 September 1962) is a Northern Irish cricket umpire. He stood in his first One Day International (ODI), between Ireland and Pakistan, on 28 May 2011. He stood in his first Twenty20 International (T20I), between the Netherlands and Canada in the 2012 ICC World Twenty20 Qualifier, on 13 March 2012.

In January 2018, he was named as one of the seventeen on-field umpires for the 2018 Under-19 Cricket World Cup. In February 2019, he was selected as part of an umpire exchange programme with Cricket West Indies to stand in matches in the Caribbean. The same month, he was one of the two on-field umpires in the match between Trinidad and Tobago and the Windward Islands in the 2018–19 Regional Four Day Competition fixture at Windsor Park in Roseau.

In April 2019, he was one of four umpires to be awarded a full-time season contract by Cricket Ireland, the first time that Cricket Ireland have offered such contracts to umpires.

See also
 List of One Day International cricket umpires
 List of Twenty20 International cricket umpires

References

1962 births
Living people
Irish One Day International cricket umpires
Irish Twenty20 International cricket umpires
Sportspeople from Belfast